Lone Eagle Peak is a mountain summit in the Indian Peaks of the Front Range of the Rocky Mountains of North America. Lone Eagle Peak was named in honor of Charles Lindbergh.

Historical names
Lindbergh Peak
Lone Eagle Peak – 1961 
Mount Lindbergh

See also

List of the most prominent summits of Colorado
List of Colorado county high points

References

External links

Mountains of Colorado
Mountains of Grand County, Colorado
Arapaho National Forest
North American 3000 m summits